Saint-Martin-Vésubie (Vivaro-Alpine: Sant Martin de Lantosca) is a commune of the Alpes-Maritimes department, Provence-Alpes-Côte d'Azur region in Southeastern France. Established on the edge of a glacial plate, it had a population of 1,327 in 2008. It was named after the Vésubie, a local river.

History

Early years
San Martin first appears in recorded history in the 12th century, although there are archaeological remnants of a Romanized indigenous population dating back to the 1st century. The medieval castrum extends along a cliff overlooking Valley of the Madonna through which ran the old Salt Road that extended from the Piedmont to the port city of Nice.

It was part of the historic County of Nice until 1860 as San Martino Vesubia. In their 1997 book "The Templar Revelation," Lynn Picknett and Clive Prince write that Saint-Martin-de-Vésubie was the "site of a legendary massacre of Templars in 1308."

Recent times

In World War II, the Alpes-Maritimes were occupied by the Italian Fourth Army from 11 November 1942 onwards. The sympathy of the Italian authorities caused the area to become a safe haven for thousands of Jewish refugees. Jews were able to achieve a modicum of safety and legal residency under the Italian authorities, who relocated them to Saint-Martin-Vésubie. The sympathy of the Italian authorities was mainly due to the work of the Italian Jewish banker Angelo Donati, who was living in Nice and convinced them to protect the Jews from French and German persecution.

After the Italian Armistice in September 1943, and under direct threat from the German authorities, a thousand of Saint-Martin's Jews made the climb up the Old Salt Road mountain passes in the Gesso Valley and what they thought was the safety of Italy .  Almost all the remaining Jews in Saint-Martin were arrested and transported to Auschwitz.

The local gendarmerie commander, Maréchal des logis-chef Landry Mangon and his wife Adrienne took under protection a one year old Jewish child named Jean-Claude Dreymann and another officer Joseph Fougere and his wife Yvonne took the child's five-year-old sister Cecile and presented them as their children during the Gestapo's round-up of Jews and thereby saved their lives. For this noble act and the risks they took on their lives and their families to save Jews, the families of the officers were recognised as Righteous among the Nations at a ceremony that was conducted at the town hall on 5 September 2010.

The village was hit heavily by Storm Alex in October 2020.

Media
Saint-Martin features in the first scenes of Wandering Star, the novel by J. M. G. Le Clézio.

See also
 Communes of the Alpes-Maritimes department

References

External links

  & (Occitan) Dances and traditional musics in Saint-Martin-Vésubie : brandi of the conscripts.

Communes of Alpes-Maritimes